John Laurance (sometimes spelled "Lawrence" or "Laurence") (1750 – November 11, 1810) was a delegate to the 6th, 7th, and 8th Congresses of the Confederation, a United States representative and United States Senator from New York and a United States district judge of the United States District Court for the District of New York.

Laurance briefly served as President pro tempore of the United States Senate in December 1798.

Education and career
Born in 1750, near Falmouth, Cornwall, England, Laurance immigrated to the Province of New York, British America in 1767 and settled in New York City.

He pursued academic studies, then read law in 1772, with Cadwallader Colden, the Lieutenant Governor of New York.

He was admitted to the bar and entered private practice in New York City, Province of New York, from July 4, 1776) from 1772 to 1776.

In 1775, Laurance married Elizabeth McDougall, the daughter of General Alexander McDougall.

Military service
Laurance served in the Continental Army during the American Revolutionary War as a commissioned officer from 1775 to 1782. At the outbreak of war in 1775, he was appointed a second lieutenant in the 4th New York Regiment, and took part in the 1775 Invasion of Quebec. In 1776, he received a commission as captain and paymaster of the Continental Army's 1st New York Regiment, serving under his father-in-law Alexander McDougall (sometimes spelled MacDougall).

He was Judge Advocate General from 1777 to 1782. Among the cases he handled were prosecuting at the court-martial of Charles Lee for insubordination in 1778, and the 1779 court-martial of Benedict Arnold for corruption. He also presided at the trial of Major John André, serving on the 1780 board that convicted the major of spying and sentenced him to death by hanging, and was the board's recorder.

Laurance attained the rank of colonel and resigned his commission in 1782. He was a charter member of the Society of the Cincinnati.

Post-war career
He resumed private practice in New York City from 1782 to 1785. Among Laurance's legal apprentices was Charles Adams, son of President John Adams. He was also active in land speculation and other business ventures with Alexander Hamilton.

He was a member of the New York State Assembly, serving from 1782 to 1783 from Westchester County, and from New York County from 1784 to 1785.

He was a regent of the University of the State of New York in 1784. He was a trustee of Columbia College (now Columbia University) from 1784 to 1810.

He was a delegate to the 6th, 7th and 8th Congresses of the Confederation (Continental Congresses) from 1785 to 1787.

He was a member of the New York State Senate from 1788 to 1790. While serving in the State Senate, Laurance was also a member of New York City's Board of Aldermen.

He was an ardent supporter of adopting the United States Constitution.

United States representative 
Laurance was elected as a Federalist from New York's 2nd congressional district to the United States House of Representatives of the 1st and 2nd United States Congresses, serving from March 4, 1789, to March 3, 1793. During this time, in 1790, his first wife Elizabeth (McDougall) Laurance died, and in 1791 he married Elizabeth Lawrence Allen (d. 1800), the widow of attorney James Allen, and mother of four children.

Federal judicial service
Laurance was nominated by President George Washington on May 5, 1794, to a seat on the United States District Court for the District of New York vacated by Judge James Duane. He was confirmed by the United States Senate on May 6, 1794, and received his commission the same day. His service terminated on November 8, 1796, due to his resignation, after his election as United States Senator from New York.

United States senator 
Laurance was elected as a Federalist to the United States Senate from New York to fill the vacancy caused by the resignation of United States Senator Rufus King and served from November 9, 1796, until August 1800, when he resigned. He served as President pro tempore of the United States Senate during the 5th United States Congress.

Later career and death
Following his departure from Congress, Laurance resumed private practice in New York City from 1800 to 1810, also residing there until his death. He died on November 11, 1810, in New York City. He was interred at the First Presbyterian Church in Manhattan.

Legacy
After more than two centuries of neglect by historians, the first book-length study of John Laurance was published by the American Philosophical Society in 2019.

See also
 List of United States senators born outside the United States

References

Sources

Internet

Magazines

External sources

 
 The New York Civil List compiled by Franklin Benjamin Hough (pages 62, 113f, 142, 161f and 287; Weed, Parsons and Co., 1858) [gives surname as "Lawrence"]
 Members of the 4th U.S. Congress
 Members of the 6th U.S. Congress
 

1750 births
1810 deaths
People from Falmouth, Cornwall
British emigrants to the Thirteen Colonies
American people of Cornish descent
American Episcopalians
Continental Congressmen from New York (state)
Pro-Administration Party members of the United States House of Representatives from New York (state)
Federalist Party United States senators from New York (state)
Presidents pro tempore of the United States Senate
Members of the New York State Assembly
New York (state) state senators
Judges of the United States District Court for the District of New York
United States federal judges appointed by George Washington
United States federal judges admitted to the practice of law by reading law
Lawyers from New York City
Politicians from New York City
18th-century American judges
Judge Advocates General of the United States Army
United States Army Judge Advocate General's Corps
Continental Army staff officers
Continental Army officers from New York (state)